Telam Suranjit Singh (born 1 May 1999) is an Indian professional footballer who plays as a midfielder for I-League club TRAU.

Early life 
Singh was born on 1 May 1999 in Manipur, India.

Career

Indian Arrows 
Singh signed his first senior contract for Indian Arrows for the 2019–20 I-League season. Singh made his debut on 28 December 2019 against Churchill Brothers as a substitute for Manvir Singh in the 76th minute. He scored his debut goal for the club in his debut game in the 90th minute of the match when the score was levelled 1–1. The match ended 1–2 in favour of Indian Arrows by the last minute goal of Singh. Singh was used as a substitute for 7 consecutive matches until he made his first breakthrough to the starting line-up in the match against NEROCA on 11 February 2020 which ended in a goalless draw. Singh played 11 matches and scored 1 goal during his time at Indian Arrows.

RoundGlass Punjab 
For the 2020–21 season of I-League, Singh joined the Mohali-based club RoundGlass Punjab. Singh played his debut match for RoundGlass Punjab against Aizawl on 9 January 2021 as a substitute for Joseba Beitia in the 90th minute. The match ended 1–0 to Punjab. He started for the first time in the season in the next match against Churchill Brothers on 19 January which ended in a 0–1 defeat for Punjab. Singh played his last match of the season on 8 March against TRAU. The match ended in a 1–0 defeat for Punjab.

Career statistics

Club

Honours
East Bengal
IFA Shield: 2018

References

External links 

 

1999 births
Living people
Indian footballers
Association football midfielders
I-League players
Indian Arrows players
RoundGlass Punjab FC players
People from Manipur
Footballers from Manipur